Belgium at the UCI Road World Championships is an overview of the Belgian results at the UCI Road World Championships. The Belgian competitors are selected by coaches of the Royal Belgian Cycling League. Apart from cycling events at the four-yearly Summer Olympics, the only times that road cyclists appear in proper national selections (instead of in commercial cycling teams) of one or multiple athletes are the yearly UCI Road World Championships. Because of this, all Belgian national road cycling teams (either elite, amateur or younger teams) only compete as such during one day per year. Belgium first sent athletes to the World Championships in the early 1920s when only amateur cyclists competed. The nation's first medal, a gold, was earned by Henri Hoevenaers in the men's amateur road race in 1925.

List of medalists

This a list of all Belgian medals (including elite, amateur, under-23 and junior races).
Since the 2012 UCI Road World Championships there is the men's and women's team time trial event for trade teams and these medals are included under the UCI registration country of the team. Note that in these events also foreign cyclists can belong to the "national" team.

Medals by discipline
Updated after 2022 UCI Road World Championships on 26 September

References

Nations at the UCI Road World Championships
Belgium at cycling events